Charles Wicks may refer to:

 Charles E. Wicks (1925–2010), professor of chemical engineering
 Charles W. Wicks (1862–1931), American businessman and politician from New York